Michael Grant Pote (born 21 December 1989) is a South African cricketer, who currently plays domestic cricket for the Cape Cobras and Western Province as an opening batsman and part-time leg-spinner. Pote made his first-class debut in 2012 for Western Province and was forced to retire hurt on 0*. Returning from injury, Pote made an almost incredible come back to cricket with scores of 119, 100*, 80, 90 and 122 in successive innings. From that success, Pote was signed up with a semi-pro contract with the Cape Cobras.

External links

1989 births
Living people
Cricketers from Cape Town
South African cricketers
Western Province cricketers